Aleksandr Dmitrievich Mikhailov (17 (29) January 1855, Putivl, Kursk Governorate – 18 (30) March 1884, Saint Petersburg) was a leading Russian revolutionary, populist and one of the founders of Zemlya Volya and Narodnaya Volya.

Biography 
Mikhailov was born in Kursk in to a family of poor landowners. He entered St. Petersburg Polytechnic University but was expelled due to involvement in the revolutionary student movement and was sent back to Putivl.

In autumn 1876 he returned to St. Petersburg and entered the Mining Institute and became one of the active organizers of the "Land and Liberty" society. In 1877, he went  Saratov province, among the Old Believers, hoping over time to reform the Old Belief into a revolutionary religion.

In 1878 he returned to St. Petersburg and took part in the revision of the program and charter of the society, which was striving for greater centralization. Mikhailov took part in the military ventures of the Zemstvo volunteers for an unsuccessful attempt to free an arrested comrade and preparation of an attempt on the life of the gendarme chief Nikolai Mezentsov and other actions.

A talented organizer, he demanded strict discipline from his comrades, and developed an effective conspiracy system. He knew all the courtyards of St. Petersburg, for which he received the nickname "Janitor". In 1879, after the Lipetsk and Voronezh congresses, when the "Land and Freedom" split took place, he became a member of the Executive Committee of the People's Will (Narodnaya Volya. Mikhailov established the work of underground printing houses and dealt with party finances.

He was arrested in November 1880 and tried in 1882 in the Trial of the 20. At the trial he delivered a speech in which he argued that the defendants were not a "gang of murderers" as the prosecutor presented it, but a party fighting for "raising the interests of the people above the interests of autocracy."

At first being sentenced to death, his sentence was commuted to eternal hard labour. He died in the Peter Paul Fortress at the age of 29 and later secretly buried in the Preobrazhensky cemetery in St. Petersburg.

References 

1855 births
1884 deaths
People from Sumy Oblast
People from Putivlsky Uyezd
Narodnaya Volya
Revolutionaries from the Russian Empire
Russian revolutionaries
Prisoners of the Peter and Paul Fortress